Mastriani is a surname. Notable people with the surname include:

People 
Francesco Mastriani (1819–1891), Italian novelist
Gonzalo Mastriani (born 1993), Uruguayan footballer

Characters 
 Jess Mastriani, character in the Canadian television series Missing

See also 
 Doug Mastriano, American politician with a similar surname